Rolland Edward Brumbaugh (November 9, 1885 – October 20, 1922) was an American football player and coach. He served as the head football coach at Lake Forest College in Lake Forest, Illinois in 1907, and at his alma mater, Gettysburg College, in 1908, compiling a career college football coaching record of 10–3–1.

Head coaching record

References

External links
 

1885 births
1922 deaths
Gettysburg Bullets baseball players
Gettysburg Bullets football coaches
Gettysburg Bullets football players
Lake Forest Foresters football coaches
People from Roaring Spring, Pennsylvania
Players of American football from Pennsylvania